Michael Gribskov is a professor of Biological Sciences and Computer Science at Purdue University.
In 1979, Gribskov graduated from Oregon State University, with a Bachelor in Science Honors degree in Biochemistry and Biophysics. Later in 1985, he finished his PhD degree in Molecular Biology from University of Wisconsin–Madison.

He has served as president of the International Society for Computational Biology, and his faculty page states that he is the chair of the Protein Information Resource Scientific Oversight and Advisory Board, and on the editorial boards of the journals Bioinformatics, Journal of Computational Biology and Chemistry, and Journal of Molecular Microbiology & Biotechnology.

Profile analysis 
Gribskov, along with David Eisenberg and Andrew McLachlan, introduced the profile analysis method in 1987; this is a method for detecting distantly related proteins by sequence comparison. A profile is a position specific scoring matrix, and it is created from a group of sequences previously aligned (probe). The similarity of any other sequence (target) (one or more than one) to the probe can be tested by comparing the target to the file using dynamic programming. This algorithm consists of two steps. The first step is the generation of the profile using software PROFWARE, which makes use of an existing alignment (probe) based on sequence similarity or the corresponding 3D structure to generate a profile. The second step is the comparison of the profile with a database of sequences or a single sequence. In this step, based on the profile generated, the target sequence or group of sequences could be aligned using PROFINAL, dynamic programming is used in the alignment.

References 

Living people
Purdue University faculty
Oregon State University alumni
 University of Wisconsin–Madison College of Letters and Science alumni
Year of birth missing (living people)